Women's suffrage was the seeking of the right of women to vote in elections. It was carried out by both men and women, it was a very elongated and gruelling campaign that went on for 86 years before the Representation of the People Act 1918 was introduced on 6 February 1918, which provided a few women with the right to vote.

One of the first three UK societies supporting women's rights to vote was established in 1867, in Scotland's capital, the Edinburgh National Society for Women's Suffrage.

Role of different groups 

Later Scotland's suffragettes were part of the British Women's Social and Political Union militant movement, and took part in campaigns locally and in London; for example when Winston Churchill arrived to stand for election as M.P. in Dundee in 1908 he was followed by 27 of the national leaders of the women's suffrage movements. At one point he even hid in a shed and tried to host a meeting there.

Scottish women like Flora Drummond had leadership roles with the Pankhursts, in the London WSPU headquarters, and celebrated the Scottish community of activists on their release from prison. Others like Frances Parker from New Zealand, were organising the West of Scotland WSPU and like others was infamously subjected to force feeding  orally and rectally in Scottish  and British prisons. Parker was also arrested when trying to disrupt David Lloyd George from giving a speech in the Music Hall in Aberdeen, and allegedly set fire to Burns Cottage in Alloway, Ayrshire.

There were many Scottish women across all classes who took an active role in the movement to draw attention to the growing demands for equal right to Votes for Women.

Scottish branches of the National Union of Women's Suffrage Societies were active in the main cities and even in the rural and remote areas such as Dornoch, in the Highlands, Stornoway with 27 women forming a suffrage association, from the remote Western Isles (the Hebrides), as well as NUWSS Orcadian group in Orkney and a Shetland suffrage society.

Awareness raising educational resources and game 
In 2021, as yet, no accessible images of the only (known) black Scottish suffragist Jessie M. Soga have been identified, nor is it known if there were other Scottish women of colour campaigning for the vote. Dr. TS Beall said Scotland's suffragists' and suffragettes' activities were not taught 'much' in Scottish schools, and their names were not generally known.

Soga was included in a new educational game (Top Trumps-style) on Scotland's Suffragettes Trumps cards, produced by Protests & Suffragettes (an artists, activists and local history project including Dr. Beall) by crowdfunding to send 700 sets to schools across Scotland.  The cards were included in Scotland's Suffrage History Education Packs, 100 of which were sent to Scottish schools. Women's History Scotland's Dr. Yvonne McFadden called it 'a fun and important tool to make sure these women and their stories' are included in the Scottish school curriculum, as women's history is often limited in school history teaching. The impact of these materials was discussed on Borders TV, including the recognition by primary school children that 'change makers' were based in their own communities in Kelso and Stranraer.  

An interactive map of the specific places associated with the women's suffrage movement in Aberdeen and area, is available which shows how connected the women in this area were with the wider suffrage movement and in leadership roles. This was included into wikipedia articles at a CodeTheCity, civic open data event  called #CTC28 connections editathon in March 2023.

See also 

 Bessie Watson
 Feminism in the United Kingdom
 List of suffragists and suffragettes
 List of women's rights activists
 List of women's rights organizations
 Timeline of women's suffrage
 Women's suffrage in the United Kingdom
 Women's suffrage in Wales
 Women's suffrage organizations

References

Further reading 

 King, Elspeth (1978) The Scottish Women's Suffrage Movement. Glasgow. People's Palace Museum
 Leneman, Leah (1995) A Guid Cause: The Women's Suffrage Movement in Scotland. Edinburgh. Mercat Press.
 Leneman, Leah (2000) The Scottish Suffragettes. Edinburgh. National Museums of Scotland. 
 Pedersen, Sarah (2017) The Scottish Suffragettes and the Press. London. Palgrave MacMillan. 
 Pedersen, Sarah The Aberdeen Women's Suffrage Campaign